Lazaros Voreadis (born July 18, 1960). is a Greek basketball referee. Voreadis was born in Thessaloniki, Greece, and he speaks both Greek and English.

Refereeing career
Residing in Athens, Greece, the 85 kg professional referee officiated at the 7th World Championship for Junior Men at Thessaloniki in the year 2003. He officiated the finals of the Saporta Cup and the Korać Cup in 2002, within 15 days of each other. Voreadis officiated at the 2004 Olympic Basketball Tournament and he took the Judge's Oath at the opening ceremony to the Games. He was also a referee at the 2003 European Championship for Men.

During a Olympiakos-Panathinaikos Greek Basketball League game in 2002, he was struck by a projectile thrown by an Olympiakos fan and was comforted by colleague Nikos Papadimitriou. During the Olympic Games Men's Basketball preliminaries of Italy against Argentina game in August 2004, a bat fly off his belt.

References

IOC 2004 Summer Olympics

1960 births
Greek basketball referees
Greek men's basketball players
Living people
Olympic officials
Oath takers at the Olympic Games
Basketball players from Thessaloniki